Leeds—Grenville—Thousand Islands and Rideau Lakes is a provincial electoral district in Ontario, Canada, that has been represented in the Legislative Assembly of Ontario since 1987.  Before the 2018 election, it was known simply as Leeds—Grenville.

It consists of the United Counties of Leeds and Grenville.

Since 1999, provincial ridings have been defined to have the same borders as federal ridings.

For the 2018 election, the district gave up a small portion of territory to Lanark—Frontenac—Kingston.

Members of Provincial Parliament

Election results

2007 electoral reform referendum

References

External links
Map of riding for 2018 election

Brockville
Ontario provincial electoral districts